Music Is the Message is the second studio album, and the fourth overall album, by the funk band Kool & the Gang. It was released in 1972.

The album peaked at No. 25 on the Billboard Top R&B/Hip-Hop Albums chart.

Track listing

Personnel 
 Dennis "D. T." Thomas – alto saxophone, vocals, flute, percussion
 Ronald Bell – tenor saxophone, vocals, alto flute
 Robert "Spike" Mickens – trumpet, vocals, flugelhorn, percussion
 Claydes Smith – guitar
 Rick West – pianos, ARP synthesizer, vocals
 Robert "Kool" Bell – bass, vocals
 George Brown – drums, percussion, vocals

Additional personnel 
 Assunta Dell’Aquila – harp

References

External links

1972 albums
Kool & the Gang albums
De-Lite Records albums